Manghot is a town which is located in Gujar Khan Tehsil, Rawalpindi District, Punjab, Pakistan. Kayani is a major tribe in Gujar Khan Tehsil which claims ancestry from Persian
Kayanian dynasty and Janjua Rajput is also a major tribe which belongs to Ranjali, Jattal and Mohra Shera Village
Tribe Awan [Malik] belong to Dohk Main Naik Muhammad in Union Council Manghot.

See also
General Ashfaq Parvez Kayani - Ex Chief of Army Staff (COAS)
Kayani clan
Janjua Rajput

References

Populated places in Gujar Khan Tehsil
Union councils of Gujar Khan Tehsil